"Don't Be Shy" is the tenth single by Japanese recording artist Arisa Mizuki. It was released on December 1, 1995, as the first single from Mizuki's third compilation album Fiore II. "Don't Be Shy" is a Japanese cover of Italian singer-songwriter Marina Rei's song of the same name, released in 1994 under the alias Jamie Dee. It was written and composed by Frank Minoia and Rei, credited as F&M Project. The song was used in commercials for Koeda chocolate sticks by Morinaga, starring Mizuki herself.

Chart performance 
"Don't Be Shy" debuted on the Oricon Weekly Singles chart at number 39 with 13,250 copies sold in its first week. The single charted for three weeks and has sold a total of 30,340 copies.

Track listing

Charts and sales

References 

1995 singles
Alisa Mizuki songs
1995 songs
Songs with lyrics by Yuho Iwasato